This list of Ivy League medical schools outlines the seven universities of the Ivy League that host a medical school; only one Ivy League university, Princeton University, does not have a medical school. All Ivy League medical schools are located in the Northeastern United States and are privately owned and controlled.

Medical Schools
At two universities, Dartmouth College and the University of Pennsylvania, medical instruction takes place on a contiguous campus shared with undergraduate students. The medical schools of Brown University, Columbia University, Harvard University, and Yale University are located on independent campuses within the same metropolitan area as their parent institutions' primary campuses. Cornell University's school of medicine is located in New York City, at a distance from the university's main campus in Ithaca.

Primary Affiliated Teaching Hospital
The Ivy League medical schools have historically been affiliated with many of the most renowned medical centers in the nation. Most of the schools have multiple primary teaching affiliates, although only the most notable ones are listed on this page. Two of the medical schools, Columbia and Cornell, share a medical campus at NewYork-Presbyterian Hospital, albeit in separate medical centers (Irving and Weill, respectively).

Rankings 
Ivy League medical schools have some of the best reputations among medical schools in the United States. They are some of the oldest institutions of medical education. Some publications' most recent rankings of medical schools at these institutions are shown below.

References

Notes 

Ivy League